Trichilia gamopetala is a species of plant in the family Meliaceae. It is endemic to Venezuela.

References

Flora of Venezuela
gamopetala
Vulnerable plants
Taxonomy articles created by Polbot